The 2011 IAFL season was the 25th regular season of the Irish American Football League.

The regular season began on Sunday, March 6, at the UCD Bowl featuring 2 of the University sides in the competition. Trinity College defeated UCD 20 - 16.

Marcus Naylor, safety of the Dublin Rebels, was named MVP for the 2011 season. In Shamrock Bowl XXV, the League's championship game, played at Morton Stadium in Santry, Dublin, the Dublin Rebels defeated the UL Vikings to win their seventh Shamrock Bowl.

Schedule

Opening Weekend
The IAFL Kickoff Game, the first game of the season took place on Sunday, March 6, 2011 at 1 pm IST with the University Bowl Game featuring UCD taking on Trinity College at the UCD Bowl in the IAFL College Championship Game. Trinity won the game 20 - 16 in what was a close game. This was the only game to take place in the opening weekend with the rest of the teams playing their matches in the next 3 weeks.

Week 4
By Week 4, all teams had played at least 1 game. The Cork Admirals, Belfast Trojans and Dublin Dragons were the final teams to play at least 1 game.

Teams
 Belfast Trojans
 Carrickfergus Knights
 Cork Admirals
 Craigavon Cowboys
 Dublin Dragons
 Dublin Rebels
 West Dublin Rhinos
 Trinity College
 UCD
 University of Limerick Vikings

Regular season standings
IAFL North

IAFL Central

IAFL South

Play-Off Qualifying Rankings
The top 2 teams qualify for the Play-Off Qualifiers.

Play-Off Qualifiers

Play-Offs

Results

Week 1

Week 2

Week 3

Week 4

Week 5

Week 6

References

External links 
 

Irish American Football League
American football in Ireland
IAFL
IAFL